Events from the year 1945 in the Republic of China. This year is numbered Minguo 34 according to the official Republic of China calendar.

Incumbents
 President – Chiang Kai-shek
 Premier – T. V. Soong
 Vice Premier – Weng Wenhao

Events

August
 4 August – Second Guangxi Campaign in Kwangsi.
 9–20 August  – Soviet invasion of Manchuria
 14 August – The signing of Sino-Soviet Treaty of Friendship and Alliance between the Republic of China and Soviet Union.
 13–28 August – Southern Jiangsu Campaign.
 15–23 August – Battle of Baoying in Kiangsu.
 16–19 August – Battle of Yongjiazhen in Anhwei.
 17 August – Battle of Tianmen in Hupeh.
 24 August – Battle of Wuhe in Anhwei.
 26–27 August – Battle of Yinji in Honan.

September
 1–13 September – Battle of Dazhongji in Kiangsu.
 4–5 September – Battle of Lingbi in Anhwei.
 8–12 September – Taixing Campaign in Kiangsu.
 13–17 September – Wudi Campaign in Shantung.
 18 September – Battle of Xiangshuikou in Kiangsu.
 21 September – Battle of Rugao in Kiangsu.

October
 10 October – Double Tenth Agreement signing in Chungking.
 12 October – Peip'ing C-46 crash near Beiping.
 18 October – Battle of Houmajia in Anhwei.
 25 October
 Retrocession Day of Taiwan in Zhongshan Hall in Taipei, Taiwan.
 The establishment of Taiwan Provincial Government in Taiwan.

November
 15 November – The renaming of Taihoku Imperial University to National Taiwan University in Taiwan.

December
 19–21 December – Battle of Shaobo in Kiangsu.
 19–26 December – Gaoyou–Shaobo Campaign in Kiangsu.
 21–30 December – Battle of Tangtou–Guocun in Kiangsu.

Births
 23 June – Michael Sze, Hong Kong government official
 25 October – Lin Kuang-hua, Governor of Taiwan Province (2003-2006).

Deaths
Peng Yubin

See also
 List of Chinese films of the 1940s

References

 
1940s in China
1945 in Taiwan
Years of the 20th century in China
Years of the 20th century in Taiwan